

Events

Pre-1600
 222 – Roman emperor Elagabalus is murdered alongside his mother, Julia Soaemias. He is replaced by his 14-year old cousin, Severus Alexander.
 843 – Triumph of Orthodoxy: Empress Theodora II restores the veneration of icons in the Orthodox churches in the Byzantine Empire.
1343 – Arnošt of Pardubice becomes the last Bishop of Prague (3 March 1343 O.S.), and, a year later, the first Archbishop of Prague.
1387 – Battle of Castagnaro: Padua, led by John Hawkwood, is victorious over Giovanni Ordelaffi of Verona.

1601–1900
1641 – Guaraní forces living in the Jesuit reductions defeat bandeirantes loyal to the Portuguese Empire at the Battle of Mbororé in present-day Panambí, Argentina.
1649 – The Frondeurs and the French government sign the Peace of Rueil.
1702 – The Daily Courant, England's first national daily newspaper, is published for the first time.
1708 – Queen Anne withholds Royal Assent from the Scottish Militia Bill, the last time a British monarch vetoes legislation.
1784 – The signing of the Treaty of Mangalore brings the Second Anglo-Mysore War to an end.
1795 – The Battle of Kharda is fought between the Maratha Confederacy and the Nizam of Hyderabad, resulting in Maratha victory.
1845 – Flagstaff War: Unhappy with translational differences regarding the Treaty of Waitangi, chiefs Hone Heke, Kawiti and Māori tribe members chop down the British flagpole for a fourth time and drive settlers out of Kororareka, New Zealand.
1848 – Louis-Hippolyte Lafontaine and Robert Baldwin become the first Prime Ministers of the Province of Canada to be democratically elected under a system of responsible government.
1851 – The first performance of Rigoletto by Giuseppe Verdi takes place in Venice.
1861 – American Civil War: The Constitution of the Confederate States of America is adopted.
1864 – The Great Sheffield Flood kills 238 people in Sheffield, England.
1872 – Construction of the Seven Sisters Colliery, South Wales, begins; it is located on one of the richest coal sources in Britain.
1879 – Shō Tai formally abdicates his position of King of Ryūkyū, under orders from Tokyo, ending the Ryukyu Kingdom.
1888 – The Great Blizzard of 1888 begins along the eastern seaboard of the United States, shutting down commerce and killing more than 400 people.

1901–present
1917 – World War I: Mesopotamian campaign: Baghdad falls to Anglo-Indian forces commanded by General Frederick Stanley Maude.
1927 – In New York City, Samuel Roxy Rothafel opens the Roxy Theatre.
1941 – World War II: United States President Franklin D. Roosevelt signs the Lend-Lease Act into law, allowing American-built war supplies to be shipped to the Allies on loan.
1945 – World War II:  The Imperial Japanese Navy attempts a large-scale kamikaze attack on the U.S. Pacific Fleet anchored at Ulithi atoll in Operation Tan No. 2.
  1945   – World War II: The Empire of Vietnam, a short-lived Japanese puppet state, is established.
1946 – Rudolf Höss, the first commandant of Auschwitz concentration camp, is captured by British troops.
1977 – The 1977 Hanafi Siege: Around 150 hostages held in Washington, D.C., by Hanafi Muslims are set free after ambassadors from three Islamic nations join negotiations.
1978 – Coastal Road massacre: At least 37 are killed and more than 70 are wounded when Fatah hijack an Israeli bus, prompting Israel's Operation Litani.
1981 – Hundreds of students protest in the University of Pristina in Kosovo, then part of Yugoslavia, to give their province more political rights. The protests then became a nationwide movement. 
1982 – Fifteen people are killed when Widerøe Flight 933 crashes into the Barents Sea near Gamvik, Norway. 
1983 – Bob Hawke is appointed Prime Minister of Australia.
1985 – Mikhail Gorbachev is elected to the position of General Secretary of the Communist Party of the Soviet Union, making Gorbachev the USSR's de facto, and last, head of state.
1990 – Lithuania declares independence from the Soviet Union.
  1990   – Patricio Aylwin is sworn in as the first democratically elected President of Chile since 1970.
2003 – The International Criminal Court holds its inaugural session in The Hague.
2004 – Madrid train bombings: Simultaneous explosions on rush hour trains in Madrid, Spain kill 191 people.
2006 – Michelle Bachelet is inaugurated as the first female president of Chile.
2009 – Winnenden school shooting: Sixteen are killed and 11 are injured before recent graduate Tim Kretschmer shoots and kills himself, leading to tightened weapons restrictions in Germany.
2010 – Economist and businessman Sebastián Piñera is sworn in as President of Chile. Aftershocks of the 2010 Pichilemu earthquake hit central Chile during the ceremony.
This event also triggered the second largest nuclear accident in history, and one of only two events to be classified as a Level 7 on the International Nuclear Event Scale.
2012 – A U.S. soldier kills 16 civilians in the Panjwayi District of Afghanistan near Kandahar.
2020 – The World Health Organization (WHO) declares the COVID-19 virus epidemic a pandemic.
2021 – US President Joe Biden signs the $1.9 trillion American Rescue Plan into law.
2023 – The Burmese military kills at least 30 villagers, including 3 Buddhist monks, during the Pinlaung massacre in Shan State, Myanmar.

Births

Pre-1600
1278 – Mary of Woodstock, daughter of Edward I of England (d. c.1332)  
1544 – Torquato Tasso, Italian poet and educator (d. 1595)

1601–1900
1738 – Benjamin Tupper, American general (d. 1792)
1785 – John McLean, American jurist and politician (d. 1861)
1806 – Louis Boulanger, French Romantic painter, lithographer and illustrator (d. 1867)
1811 – Urbain Le Verrier, French mathematician and astronomer (d. 1877)
1815 – Anna Bochkoltz, German operatic soprano, voice teacher and composer (d. 1879)
1818 – Marius Petipa, French-Russian dancer and choreographer (d. 1910)
1819 – Henry Tate, English businessman and philanthropist, founded Tate & Lyle (d. 1899)
1822 – Joseph Louis François Bertrand, French mathematician, economist, and academic (d. 1900)
1863 – Andrew Stoddart, English cricketer and rugby player (d. 1915)
1870 – Louis Bachelier, French mathematician and theorist (d. 1946)
1876 – Carl Ruggles, American composer and painter (d. 1971)
1880 – Harry H. Laughlin, American eugenicist and sociologist (d. 1943)
1884 – Lewi Pethrus, Swedish minister and hymn-writer (d. 1974)
1885 – Malcolm Campbell, English race car driver (d. 1948)
1887 – Raoul Walsh, American actor and director (d. 1980)
1890 – Vannevar Bush, American engineer and academic (d. 1974)
1893 – Wanda Gág, American author and illustrator (d. 1946)
1897 – Henry Cowell, American pianist and composer (d. 1965)
1898 – Dorothy Gish, American actress (d. 1968)
1899 – Frederick IX of Denmark (d. 1972)
  1899   – James H. Douglas, Jr., American lawyer, and politician, United States Deputy Secretary of Defense (d. 1988)

1901–present
1903 – Ronald Syme, New Zealand historian and scholar (d. 1989)
  1903   – Lawrence Welk, American accordion player and bandleader (d. 1992)
1907 – Jessie Matthews, English actress, singer, and dancer (d. 1981)
1908 – Matti Sippala, Finnish javelin thrower (d. 1997)
1910 – Robert Havemann, German chemist and academic (d. 1982)
1911 – Sir Fitzroy Maclean, 1st Baronet, Scottish general and politician (d. 1996)
1913 – Wolf-Dietrich Wilcke, German colonel and pilot (d. 1944)
1915 – Vijay Hazare, Indian cricketer (d. 2004)
  1915   – J. C. R. Licklider, American computer scientist and psychologist (d. 1990)
1916 – Harold Wilson, English academic and politician, Prime Minister of the United Kingdom (d. 1995)
1920 – Nicolaas Bloembergen, Dutch-American physicist and academic, Nobel Prize laureate (d. 2017)
1921 – Astor Piazzolla, Argentine tango composer and bandoneon player (d. 1992)
1922 – Cornelius Castoriadis, Greek economist and philosopher (d. 1997)
  1922   – Abdul Razak Hussein, Malaysian lawyer and politician, Prime Minister of Malaysia (d. 1976)
  1922   – José Luis López Vázquez, Spanish actor and director (d. 2009)
1923 – Louise Brough, American tennis player (d. 2014)
1925 – Margaret Oakley Dayhoff, American biochemist and academic (d. 1983)
1926 – Ralph Abernathy, American minister and activist (d. 1990)
1927 – Freda Meissner-Blau, Austrian activist and politician (d. 2015)
  1927   – Robert Mosbacher, American businessman, and politician, United States Secretary of Commerce (d. 2010)
  1927   – Josep Maria Subirachs, Spanish sculptor and painter (d. 2014)
1929 – Timothy Carey, American actor, director, producer, and screenwriter (d. 1994)
  1929   – Jackie McGlew, South African cricketer (d. 1998)
1930 – David Gentleman, English illustrator and engraver
  1930   – Claude Jutra, Canadian actor, director and screenwriter (d. 1986)
1931 – Rupert Murdoch, Australian-American businessman and media magnate
1932 – Leroy Jenkins, American violinist and composer (d. 2007)
  1932   – Nigel Lawson, English journalist and politician, Chancellor of the Exchequer
1934 – Sam Donaldson, American journalist
1936 – Antonin Scalia, American lawyer and jurist, Associate Justice of the Supreme Court of the United States (d. 2016)
1940 – Alberto Cortez, Argentinian-Spanish singer-songwriter (d. 2019)
1943 – Arturo Merzario, Italian race car driver
1945 – Dock Ellis, American baseball player and coach (d. 2008)
  1945   – Harvey Mandel, American guitarist
1947 – Tristan Murail, French composer and educator
1948 – Roy Barnes, American politician, 80th Governor of Georgia
1950 – Bobby McFerrin, American singer-songwriter, producer, and conductor
  1950   – Jerry Zucker, American director, producer, and screenwriter
1951 – Dominique Sanda, French model and actress
1952 – Douglas Adams, English author and playwright (d. 2001)
1953 – Derek Daly, Irish-American race car driver and sportscaster
  1953   – Jimmy Iovine, American record producer and businessman, co-founded Beats Electronics
  1953   – Bernie LaBarge, Canadian singer-songwriter and guitarist
1954 – David Newman, American composer and conductor
  1954   – Gale Norton, American politician, 48th United States Secretary of the Interior
1955 – Leslie Cliff, Canadian swimmer
  1955   – Nina Hagen, German singer-songwriter
1956 – Willie Banks, American triple jumper
  1956   – Helen Rollason, English sports journalist and sportscaster (d. 1999)
1957 – Qasem Soleimani, Former Iranian commander of the Quds Force (d. 2020)
1958 – Anissa Jones, American child actress (d. 1976)
1959 – Nina Hartley, American pornographic actress/director, sex educator, sex-positive feminist, and author
1960 – Warwick Taylor, New Zealand rugby player
1961 – Elias Koteas, Canadian actor
  1961   – Bruce Watson, Canadian-Scottish guitarist
1962 – Matt Mead, American politician, Governor of Wyoming
1963 – Gary Barnett, English footballer and manager
  1963   – Alex Kingston, English actress
  1963   – David LaChapelle, American photographer and director
1964 – Vinnie Paul, American drummer, songwriter and producer (d. 2018)
  1964   – Shane Richie, English actor and singer
1965 – Nigel Adkins, English footballer and manager
  1965   – Jesse Jackson, Jr., American lawyer and politician
  1965   – Jenny Packham, English fashion designer
1966 – John Thompson III, American basketball player and coach
1967 – John Barrowman, Scottish-American actor and singer
  1967   – Brad Carson, American lawyer and politician
1968 – Lisa Loeb, American singer-songwriter
1969 – Terrence Howard, American actor and producer
  1969   – Soraya, Colombian-American singer-songwriter, guitarist, and producer (d. 2006)
1971 – Johnny Knoxville, American actor and entertainer
1974 – Bobby Abreu, Venezuelan baseball player
1976 – Thomas Gravesen, Danish footballer
1977 – Becky Hammon, American-Russian basketball player and coach
1978 – Didier Drogba, Ivorian footballer
  1978   – Albert Luque, Spanish footballer
1979 – Elton Brand, American basketball player
  1979   – Fred Jones, American basketball player
  1979   – Benji Madden, American singer-songwriter and guitarist
  1979   – Joel Madden, American singer-songwriter and producer
1980 – Dan Uggla, American baseball player
1981 – LeToya Luckett, American singer-songwriter and actress
1982 – Brian Anderson, American baseball player
1985 – Paul Bissonnette, Canadian ice hockey player
  1985   – Daniel Vázquez Evuy, Equatoguinean footballer
  1985   – Cassandra Fairbanks, American journalist and activist
  1985   – Stelios Malezas, Greek footballer
  1985   – Greg Olsen, American football player and commentator
  1985   – Nikolai Topor-Stanley, Australian footballer
1986 – Dario Cologna, Swiss skier
1987 – Marc-André Gragnani, Canadian ice hockey player
  1987   – Tanel Kangert, Estonian cyclist
  1987   – Ngonidzashe Makusha, Zimbabwean sprinter and long jumper
1988 – Fábio Coentrão, Portuguese footballer
  1988   – Cecil Lolo, South African footballer (d. 2015)
1989 – Anton Yelchin, Russian-born American actor (d. 2016)
1990 – Ayumi Morita, Japanese tennis player
1993 – Jodie Comer, British actress
  1993   – Anthony Davis, American basketball player
1994 – Andrew Robertson, Scottish footballer

Deaths

Pre-1600
 222 – Elagabalus, Roman emperor (b. 203)
 638 – Sophronius of Jerusalem (b. 560)
1198 – Marie of France, Countess of Champagne (b. 1145)
1486 – Albrecht III Achilles, Elector of Brandenburg (b. 1414)
1575 – Matthias Flacius, Croatian theologian and reformer (b. 1520)

1601–1900
1602 – Emilio de' Cavalieri, Italian organist and composer (b. 1550)
1607 – Giovanni Maria Nanino, Italian composer and educator (b. 1543)
1665 – Clemente Tabone, Maltese landowner and militia member (b. c. 1575)
1722 – John Toland, Irish philosopher and theorist (b. 1670)
1759 – John Forbes, Scottish general (b. 1707)
1820 – Benjamin West, American-English painter and academic (b. 1738)
1851 – Marie-Louise Coidavid, Queen of Haiti (b. 1778)
  1851   – George McDuffie, American lawyer and politician, 55th Governor of South Carolina (b. 1790)
1863 – Sir James Outram, 1st Baronet, English general (b. 1803)
1869 – Vladimir Odoyevsky, Russian philosopher and critic (b. 1803)
1870 – Moshoeshoe I of Lesotho (b. 1786)
1874 – Charles Sumner, American lawyer and politician (b. 1811)
1898 – William Rosecrans, American general and politician (b. 1819)

1901–present
1907 – Jean Casimir-Perier, French lawyer and politician, 6th President of France (b. 1847)
1908 – Edmondo De Amicis, Italian journalist and author (b. 1846)
  1908   – Benjamin Waugh, English minister and activist (b. 1839)
1915 – Thomas Alexander Browne, English-Australian author (b. 1826)
1931 – F. W. Murnau, German-American director, producer, and screenwriter (b. 1888)
1937 – Joseph S. Cullinan, American businessman, co-founded Texaco (b. 1860)
1944 – Hendrik Willem van Loon, Dutch-American journalist and historian (b. 1882)
  1944   – Edgar Zilsel, Austrian historian and philosopher of science, linked to the Vienna Circle (b. 1891)
1949 – Henri Giraud, French general and politician (b. 1879)
1952 – Pierre Renoir, French actor and director (b. 1885)
1955 – Alexander Fleming, Scottish biologist, pharmacologist, and botanist, Nobel Prize laureate (b. 1881)
  1955   – Oscar F. Mayer, German-American businessman, founded Oscar Mayer (b. 1859)
1956 – Aleksanteri Aava, Finnish poet (b. 1883)
1957 – Richard E. Byrd, American admiral and explorer (b. 1888)
1959 – Lester Dent, American author (b. 1904)
1960 – Roy Chapman Andrews, American paleontologist and explorer (b. 1884)
1967 – Geraldine Farrar, American soprano and actress (b. 1882)
1969 – John Wyndham, English author (b. 1903)
1970 – Erle Stanley Gardner, American lawyer and author (b. 1889)
1971 – Philo Farnsworth, American inventor (b. 1906)
  1971   – Whitney Young, American activist (b. 1921)
1982 – Edmund Cooper, English poet and author (b. 1926)
  1982   – Horace Gregory, American poet, translator, and academic (b. 1898)
1986 – Sonny Terry, American singer and harmonica player (b. 1911)
1989 – James Kee, American lawyer and politician (b. 1917)
  1989   – John J. McCloy, American lawyer and diplomat (b. 1895)
1992 – Richard Brooks, American director, producer, and screenwriter (b. 1912)
1995 – Myfanwy Talog, Welsh actress and singer (b. 1945)
1996 – Vince Edwards, American actor and director (b. 1928)
1999 – Herbert Jasper, Canadian psychologist, anatomist, and neurologist (b. 1906)
  1999   – Camille Laurin, Canadian psychiatrist and politician (b. 1922)
2002 – James Tobin, American economist, Nobel Prize laureate (b. 1918)
2006 – Bernie Geoffrion, Canadian ice hockey player and coach (b. 1931)
  2006   – Slobodan Milošević, Serbian lawyer and politician, 3rd President of the Federal Republic of Yugoslavia (b. 1941)
2010 – Hans van Mierlo, Dutch politician, Deputy Prime Minister of the Netherlands (b. 1931)
2012 – James B. Morehead, American colonel and pilot (b. 1916)
2013 – Martin Adolf Bormann, German priest and theologian (b. 1930)
  2013   – Simón Alberto Consalvi, Venezuelan journalist and politician, Minister of Foreign Affairs for Venezuela (b. 1927)
2014 – Dean Bailey, Australian footballer and coach (b. 1967)
  2014   – Joel Brinkley, American journalist and academic (b. 1952)
2015 – Walter Burkert, German philologist and scholar (b. 1931)
  2015   – Jimmy Greenspoon, American singer-songwriter and keyboard player (b. 1948)
2016 – Iolanda Balaș, Romanian high jumper (b. 1936)
  2016   – Doreen Massey, English geographer and political activist (b. 1944)
2018 – Ken Dodd, English comedian and singer (b. 1927)
  2018   – Siegfried Rauch, German actor (b. 1932)
  2018   – Karl Lehmann, German cardinal (b. 1936)
  2018   – Mary Rosenblum, American science fiction and mystery author (b. 1952)
2021 – Ray Campi, American singer and musician (b. 1934)
  2021   – Takis Mousafiris, Greek composer and songwriter (b. 1936)
2022 – Rupiah Banda, President of Zambia (b. 1937)

Holidays and observances
Christian feast day:
Alberta of Agen
Constantine
Óengus of Tallaght
Sophronius of Jerusalem
Vindicianus
Day of Restoration of Independence from the Soviet Union in 1990 (Lithuania)
Moshoeshoe Day (Lesotho)

Notes

References

External links

 BBC: On This Day
 
 Historical Events on March 11

Days of the year
March